Asker Seminary was a teachers' seminary at Bjerke near Tanum.

Tanum is located in Bærum, which then was a part of Asker parish. The seminary was established in 1834 to educate teachers that conformed with the School Act of 1827. The education spanned two years and was free of charge. The first manager of the seminary was Knud Gislesen from 1834 to 1855, later a bishop. Several of the seminary's alumni became clergymen, politicians, academics or artists.

In 1898, the school itself moved to  Holmestrand and became Holmestrand Seminary. 

The building was occupied by a girls' school afterward, and is now home to a child and adolescent psychiatric facility, referred to as Bjerketun.

External links 
Students taking a walk (1898) on Baærum Library's Website

Students ring dancing (1895 or 1905) on Bærum Library's Website

Information on Asker Seminary on Bærum Library's Website (in Norwegian)

Riksarkivet entry for Bjerketun.

References

Seminaries and theological colleges in Norway
Education in Bærum
Educational institutions established in 1834
1834 establishments in Norway